Willie Newton is an Australian former professional rugby league footballer who played in the 1990s. He played for Western Suburbs in the ARL competition.

Playing career
Newton made his first grade debut for Western Suburbs in round 20 of the 1996 ARL season against North Sydney at Campbelltown Sports Ground. The match is remembered for a field goal from Andrew Willis who won the game for Wests 23-22. Newton played two further games for the club in the 1996 season. In 1997, Newton made two appearances for Western Suburbs with the last being in round 3 against South Sydney which Wests lost 17-8.

References

1978 births
Western Suburbs Magpies players
Australian rugby league players
Rugby league halfbacks
Living people